Matsaile Airport  is an airport serving the village of  Matsaile in Thaba-Tseka District, Lesotho.

See also
List of airports in Lesotho
Transport in Lesotho

References

External links
 OurAirports - Matsaile
 Matsaile Airport
 OpenStreetMap - Matsaile

Airports in Lesotho